Martina Hingis was the defending champion but lost in the second round to Venus Williams.

Arantxa Sánchez-Vicario won in the final 6–1, 6–3 against Williams.

Seeds
A champion seed is indicated in bold text while text in italics indicates the round in which that seed was eliminated. The top four seeds received a bye to the second round.

  Martina Hingis (second round)
  Lindsay Davenport (quarterfinals)
  Amanda Coetzer (second round)
  Irina Spîrlea (second round)
  Arantxa Sánchez-Vicario (champion)
  Conchita Martínez (second round)
  Sandrine Testud (second round)
  Anke Huber (first round)

Draw

Final

Section 1

Section 2

External links
 Singles and Doubles Main Draws

Women's Singles
Singles